John M. Pommersheim is an American diplomat he was served as the United States Ambassador to Tajikistan.

Education 

Pommersheim earned a Bachelor of Arts from Bucknell University, Master of Arts from Columbia University, and studied at the Pushkin State Russian Language Institute on a Department of Defense scholarship.

Career 

Pommersheim is a career member of the Senior Foreign Service, class of Counselor. He has served as an American diplomat since 1990. He has served as Consul General/Principal Officer at the United States Consulate in Vladivostok, Russia and at six United States Missions overseas, including in China and Japan. He most recently served as the Deputy Chief of Mission at the United States Embassy in Astana, Kazakhstan.

On September 18, 2018, President Donald Trump nominated Pommersheim to be the next United States Ambassador to Tajikistan. On January 2, 2019, his nomination was confirmed in the United States Senate by voice vote. He was sworn into office on February 22, 2019, and arrived in Tajikistan on March 11, 2019. He presented his credentials to President Emomali Rahmon on March 15, 2019.

Personal life 
Pommersheim speaks Russian, German, Japanese, and Chinese.

See also
List of ambassadors of the United States

References

Living people
Date of birth missing (living people)
Year of birth missing (living people)
Place of birth missing (living people)
21st-century American diplomats
Ambassadors of the United States to Tajikistan
Bucknell University alumni
Columbia University alumni
United States Foreign Service personnel